Eliyahu "Elye" Falkovitsh (1898–1979) was a Belarusian-Jewish Yiddish linguist.

Early life
Born in Gomel in the Mogilev Governorate of the Russian Empire (present-day Belarus), Falkovitsh lived there until age 19. In 1917 and 1918, he was the headmaster of a Jewish school in Sarapul. Afterwards, he temporarily moved to Kiev, where he was the director of a children's club in 1918 and 1919 before becoming a cultural worker for the Red Army in 1920 and 1921.

Mid-life
Studying at Moscow State University in 1921 and 1922, Falkovitsh later worked for the Commissariat of Enlightenment. Afterwards, Falkovitsh worked as a lecturer on Yiddish linguistics at the Second Moscow State University (later known as the Moscow Teachers' Training Institute) and at the Communist University of the National Minorities of the West. Falkovitsh, together with Ayzik Zaretski, was central in molding the standards of Soviet Yiddish in regards to lexicon, grammar, style, and orthography . After advocating the study of the Pentateuch and the works of Hayim Nahman Bialik and Sholem Asch, Falkovitsh temporarily lost his positions in 1937.

Later life
Falkovitsh volunteered to join the Red Army and worked as a medical orderly during World War II, saving the lives of 88 wounded people in one battle and thus receiving the Order of Lenin. After the war, Falkovitsh was editor in chief of the Moscow Yiddish Publishing House Emes until it was liquidated in 1948. Starting from 1961, Falkovitsh helped shape a revised Yiddish orthography. In addition, Falkovitsh also published two grammatical sketches of Yiddish, one in a monograph on Soviet national languages (1966) and the other (posthumously) as an appendix to a Russian-Yiddish dictionary (1984). Falkovitsh died in 1979 at age 80 or 81.

References

1898 births
1979 deaths
People from Gomel
People from Gomelsky Uyezd
Belarusian Jews
Linguists from the Soviet Union
Linguists from Belarus
20th-century linguists
Yiddish–Russian translators
Moscow State University alumni
Academic staff of Moscow State Pedagogical University
Soviet military personnel of World War II
Recipients of the Order of Lenin
20th-century translators